Matías Novoa, (born June 14, 1980) is a Chilean-Mexican actor and model. He is best known for working with TV Azteca doing telenovelas.

Personal life 
He was married to Cuban actress and singer Isabella Castillo from 2019 to 2021. He had a son with the Venezuelan actress María José Magán, born on May 12, 2011, called Axel Novoa Gómez.

Filmography

References

External links 

Mexican male telenovela actors
Chilean male models
Living people
21st-century Mexican male actors
1980 births
Chilean emigrants to Mexico